The 1910–11 Georgetown Hoyas men's basketball team represented Georgetown University during the 1910–11 Intercollegiate Athletic Association of the United States (IAAUS) college basketball season. Maurice Joyce coached the team in his fourth and final season as head coach. Georgetown was an independent and for the first time played its home games at the Arcade Rink, also known as the Arcadia and as the Arcade Auditorium, in Washington, D.C., except for an early game played on the Georgetown campus at Ryan Gymnasium. It finished the season with a record of 13-7.

Season recap

Junior forward-center Frank Schlosser led the team in scoring for the third  straight year. He had his best season, playing in 19 games and scoring a career-high 247 points and averaging a career-high 13.0 points per game. His 26 points against Catholic was a school record for scoring in a single game, and he broke it later in the season with a 28-point performance against Gallaudet.

Freshman forward Ronayne "Roy" Waldron was an undergraduate walk-on in an era when the varsity program centered on Georgetown University Law School students. He was called up to the varsity to play in seven games as a reserve, otherwise playing on the Collegians, an undergraduate team that played against local teams in the Washington, D.C., area and once beat the varsity team in an intramural game this season. He scored a total of 44 points and averaged 6.2 points per game in his seven varsity games. Over the next three seasons, he would become one of the top offensive producers of the early years of Georgetown basketball.

The teams 13-win total was the highest in Georgetown men's basketball history. It would not be equalled until the 1919-20 team finished at 13-1, and it would not be exceeded until the 1940-41 team won 16 games.

Joyce retired from coaching at the end of the season, having posted an overall record of 34-22 during his four seasons as head coach. He had introduced the new sport of basketball to the Washington, D.C., area in 1892, introduced basketball to Georgetown in 1906, and founded the Georgetown men's basketball program for its first season in 1906-07. He had become the Hoyas first head coach in the 1907-08 season, the year which saw Georgetowns first great team win the mythical "Champions of the South" title.

Roster
Sources

Georgetown players did not wear numbers on their jerseys this season. The first numbered jerseys in Georgetown mens basketball history would not appear until the 1933-34 season.

1910–11 schedule and results
Sources

It was common practice at this time for colleges and universities to include non-collegiate opponents in their schedules, with the games recognized as part of their official record for the season, and the games against Baltimore City College, Baltimore Medical College, Staunton Military Academy, and the Washington YMCA all  counted as part of Georgetowns won-loss record for 1910-11. It was not until 1952, after the completion of the 1951-52 season, that the National Collegiate Athletic Association (NCAA) ruled that colleges and universities could no longer count games played against non-collegiate opponents in their annual won-loss records.

Maryland State College was the future University of Maryland.

|-
!colspan=9 style="background:#002147; color:#8D817B;"| Regular Season

References

Georgetown Hoyas men's basketball seasons
Georgetown
Georgetown Hoyas men's basketball team
Georgetown Hoyas men's basketball team